Marko Mirkailo (born 20 June 1998) is a Serbian footballer, who plays as a defender for FK SFS Borac Paraćin.

Club career

Jagodina
Mirkailo started training football with local football school Junior, and later joined FK Jagodina. He signed scholarship deal with club as a cadet in 2013. As one of the most perspective players in the youth school, Mirkailo was loaned to Tabane Trgovački for the 2015–16 season. At the beginning of 2016, Marko signed his first professional contract with Jagodina as the best youth player of Pomoravlje District. Mirkailo joined the first team of FK Jagodina for the match against FK Čukarički played on 2 April 2016 under coach Stevan Mojsilović. In summer 2016, Mirailo extended his loan at Tabane Trgovački as a one-year dual registration until the end of 2016–17 Serbian League East season. In the winter break-off season a loan deal was terminated and Mirkailo continued season a regular team member of FK Jagodina. Making 21 appearances at total in domestic competitions for the club, Mirkailo and Jagodina mutually terminated the contract at the beginning of 2018.

Voždovac
On 18 January 2018, Mirkailo signed a four-year contract with Voždovac. Mirkailo made his debut for new club on 23 February 2018, replacing Nebojša Gavrić in 90 minute of 3–2 victory over Napredak Kruševac. He also started his first match on the field for Voždovac in 2–1 away defeat against Čukarički in  May 2018. He played a full-time match, replacing suspended Miloš Mihajlov.

International career
Mirkailo was called in Serbia national under-18 football team for several friendly matches in 2016. He made his debut for the team in 1–1 draw to Hungary on 21 April 2016.

Career statistics

Club

References

External links
 Marko Mirkailo stats at utakmica.rs 
 
 

1998 births
Living people
Sportspeople from Jagodina
Association football defenders
Serbian footballers
FK Jagodina players
FK Voždovac players
Serbian First League players
Serbian SuperLiga players